In plane geometry, the Kepler–Bouwkamp constant (or polygon inscribing constant) is obtained as a limit of the following sequence. Take a circle of radius 1. Inscribe a regular triangle in this circle. Inscribe a circle in this triangle. Inscribe a square in it. Inscribe a circle, regular pentagon, circle, regular hexagon and so forth. 
The radius of the limiting circle is called the Kepler–Bouwkamp constant.

Numerical value
The decimal expansion of the Kepler–Bouwkamp constant is 
 
 The natural logarithm of the Kepler-Bouwkamp constant is given by 
   

where  is the Riemann zeta function.

If the product is taken over the odd primes, the constant
 
is obtained .

References

Further reading

External links

Mathematical constants
Infinite products